Emmet Nolan (born 1995) is an Irish hurler who plays as a midfielder for the Offaly senior team.

Born in Birr, County Offaly, Nolan first played competitive hurling during his schooling at St. Brendan's College. He arrived on the inter-county scene at the age of sixteen when he first linked up with the Offaly minor team before later joining the under-21 side. Nolan made his senior debut during the 2015 championship.

At club level Nolan plays with Birr.

References

1995 births
Living people
Birr hurlers
Offaly inter-county hurlers